The Society of Vacuum Coaters is a non-profit, international, professional organisation for individuals who are involved in depositing films and coatings in vacuum or rarefied environments for surface engineering purposes.

Vacuum coatings 
Vacuum coatings are deposited by sputtering, vacuum deposition, ion plating, ion beam deposition, laser ablation, atomic layer deposition, or plasma arc techniques.

Members 
The  international membership includes scientists, engineers, and technologists from industry, academic, private, and national research institutes.

Activities 
The  organises technical conferences, trade exhibitions, and educational programs for professionals and hosts an annual Technical Conference & Exhibition (TechCon).

The  provides up-to-date information on coatings and surface modification by other techniques, including atmospheric plasmas, chemical vapour deposition, and printing. 

The scope of applications includes functional coatings used in optics, architectural and vehicle glass industry, electronics, transportation industry, aerospace, industrial, decorative products, anti-counterfeiting, military, packaging and medical fields.

The  publishes Technical Conference Proceedings each year. Reference volumes are available in print or online through the  website. In agreement, Elsevier publishes selected peer-reviewed papers from TechCon in the journal of Surface and Coating Technology. The  established the SVC Foundation in 2002 for scholarship and travel awards to TechCon for students.

References

External links

Engineering societies based in the United States
International trade associations
Non-profit academic publishers
Non-profit organizations based in New Mexico
Organizations established in 1957
1957 establishments in New Mexico
Thin film deposition